The Anaheim Piranhas were a professional arena football team that played in the Arena Football League from 1994 to 1997. They played their home games at Arrowhead Pond in Anaheim, California. The team was originally known as the Las Vegas Sting, prior to moving to Anaheim in 1996. The team was owned by future Arena Football League commissioner C. David Baker.

History

Las Vegas Sting (1994–1995)
The Las Vegas Sting was a team which competed in the Arena Football League during the 1994 and 1995 seasons. Their home games in 1994 were played in the MGM Grand Garden Arena, and they were moved to the Thomas & Mack Center on the campus of the University of Nevada, Las Vegas for the 1995 season. The team was relocated to Anaheim, California prior to the start of the 1996 season, at which time it was renamed the Anaheim Piranhas.

Anaheim Piranhas (1996–1997)
The Piranhas played their home games at Arrowhead Pond, also the home of the Mighty Ducks of Anaheim of the National Hockey League. The team was not an overwhelmingly successful draw in the high-overhead Southern California market and folded after the conclusion of the 1997 season.  The arena (now known as the Honda Center) would once again be the home of an AFL franchise with the launching of the Los Angeles Kiss in 2014.

Notable players

Arena Football Hall of Famers

All-Arena players
The following Sting/Piranhas players were named to All-Arena Teams:
FB/LB Kevin Carroll (1)
OL/DL Sam Hernandez (2)
DS Carlton Johnson (2), Rodney Mazion (2)
K Ian Howfield (1)
OL/DL Dan Sileo (1)

Season-by-season

References

External links
 Las Vegas Sting at ArenaFan.com
 Anaheim Piranhas at ArenaFan.com

 
American football teams established in 1996
American football teams disestablished in 1997
1996 establishments in California
1997 disestablishments in California
Defunct American football teams in California